The Clinton County Board is the legislative body in Clinton County, Illinois, made up of 15 board members who are elected by district for four- and two- year terms. The county board sets policy and laws for the county regarding property, public health services, public safety, and maintenance of county highways. It is presided over by the County Board Chairman, currently Larry Johnson.

Composition

List of members 
This is a list of the Clinton County Board Members in order by district. This list is current as of July 2021.

See also 
 Chicago City Council

References

External links 
Clinton County (official government website)
Board Members & Elected Officials

County governing bodies in the United States
Board